Raimond Burgman (born 12 February 1964) is a Dutch carom billiards player. He won at the Three-Cushion World Cup in 1996. Burgman got into third place six times at the Three-Cushion World Cup from 1994 to 2005. He placed into second place at the UMB World Three-cushion Championship and CEB European Three-cushion Championship, in which Burgman also placed in third place at the CEB European Three-cushion Championship in 2000. He won a Christmas tournament in Zundert in 2012. Burgman was also in a match against Dave Christiani.

References

External links 

1964 births
Living people
People from Heemstede
Dutch carom billiards players
Three-cushion billiards players
World champions in three-cushion billiards
World Cup champions in three-cushion billiards
Sportspeople from North Holland